NYC 1978 is a live album by American punk rock band, the Ramones.

Background
The performance was recorded January 7, 1978 near Union Square at the Palladium as part of the King Biscuit Flower Hour Archive Series. This is the last commercially recorded performance with Tommy Ramone as the Ramones' drummer. He left the band soon afterwards, although he continued to work with the other members as a producer and manager until 2014.

One quarter of a century after the recording was created, King Biscuit Flower Hour Records released the material as an album on CD to the US markets on August 19, 2003 as "NYC 1978". One year later, the same material as an album on CD was released to the UK and European markets by Sanctuary Records on February 23, 2004  with alternative cover art and title: "Live, January 7, 1978 At The Palladium, NYC".

Track listing
 "Rockaway Beach" - 2:20 
 "Teenage Lobotomy" - 2:04 
 "Blitzkrieg Bop" - 2:05 
 "I Wanna Be Well" - 2:21 
 "Glad to See You Go" - 1:51 
 "Gimme Gimme Shock Treatment" - 1:31 
 "You're Gonna Kill That Girl" - 2:32 
 "I Don't Care" - 1:45 
 "Sheena Is a Punk Rocker" - 2:17 
 "Havana Affair" - 1:35 
 "Commando" - 1:45 
 "Here Today, Gone Tomorrow" - 3:13 
 "Surfin' Bird" - 2:19 
 "Cretin Hop" - 1:45 
 "Listen to My Heart" - 1:38 
 "California Sun" - 1:47 
 "I Don't Wanna Walk Around with You" - 1:22 
 "Pinhead" - 2:52 
 "Do You Want to Dance?" - 1:40 
 "Chainsaw" - 1:28 
 "Today Your Love, Tomorrow the World" - 3:13 
 "Now I Wanna Be a Good Boy" - 2:01 
 "Suzy is a Headbanger" - 1:54 
 "Let's Dance" - 3:06 
 "Oh, Oh, I Love Her So" - 1:41 
 "Now I Wanna Sniff Some Glue" - 1:20 
 "We're a Happy Family" - 2:13 
 
 Credits 
 Cover Artwork Design – Dave Bias 
 Bass – Dee Dee Ramone 
 Drums – Tommy Ramone 
 Executive Producer – Kevin Cain, Steven Ship 
 Guitar – Johnny Ramone 
 Liner Notes – Kurt Loder 
 Mixed by, Mastered by – Glen Robinson 
 Photography by – Bob Gruen, Paul Natkin 
 Technical Consultants – Chris Barry, Jim Starace 
 Vocals – Joey Ramone 
 Written-By – D Colvin (tracks: 1 to 12, 14, 15, 17, 18, 20 to 23, 25 to 27), J Hyman (tracks: 1 to 12, 14, 15, 17, 18, 20 to 23, 25 to 27), J Cummings (tracks: 1 to 12, 14, 15, 17, 18, 20 to 23, 25 to 27), T Erdelyi (tracks: 1 to 12, 14, 15, 17, 18, 20 to 23, 25 to 27)

References

Ramones live albums
2003 live albums